The Yang di-Pertua Negeri of Malacca or Malacca Governor is the ceremonial head of state of the Malaysian state of Malacca. The Yang di-Pertua Negeri is styled Tuan Yang Terutama (TYT) (English: His Excellency).

The current office bearer, Ali Rustam, was sworn in on 4 June 2020.

List of Yang di-Pertua Negeri
The following is the list of Yang di-Pertua Negeri of Malacca:

See also
Yang di-Pertua Negeri

References

External links
 Pejabat TYT Yang di-Pertua Negeri Melaka Official website 

Malacca
Lists of political office-holders in Malaysia

1957 establishments in Malaya